The Dying Slave is a sculpture by the Italian Renaissance artist Michelangelo. Created between 1513 and 1516, it was to serve with another figure, the Rebellious Slave, at the tomb of Pope Julius II. It is a marble figure 2.15 metres (7' 4") in height, and is held at the Louvre, Paris.

In 1976 the art historian Richard Fly wrote that it "suggests that moment when life capitulates before the relentless force of dead matter".
However, in a recent scholarly volume entitled The Slave in European Art, Charles Robertson discusses the Dying Slave in the context of real slavery in Italy during the era of the Renaissance.

Fourteen reproductions of the Dying Slave adorn the top storey of the 12th arrondissement police station in Paris. Although Art Deco in style, the building was designed in 1991 by architects  and Miriam Teitelbaum.

See also
St. Quentin (Pontormo)
Representation of slavery in European art
List of works by Michelangelo

References

External links

Tomb of Pope Julius II
Italian sculptures of the Louvre
1510s sculptures
Marble sculptures in France
Sculptures by Michelangelo
Nude sculptures
Slavery in art